The club was formed by a former official of the Bush Bucks club from Durban who had moved to the area. It was named Umtata Bucks and played at the South African top level (NSL) for six seasons during Transkei's nominal independency from 1976 to 1994, managing 4 finishes in the top-7, and winning one League Cup, in 1993. After the end of Transkei's nominal independence, they won one more League Cup (in 1996). They remained at the top level (renamed PSL), moving to East London (outside of the former homeland of Transkei) in 2001, until suffering relegation at the end of the 2002/03 season. They returned after only one season, but were relegated again at the end of 2005/06 season.[1]

Telkom Knockout Winners 1993 and 1996

Since 2007 sole owner is Sturu Pasiya when he purchased a license to participate in the Vodacom League from Lion City FC.

The club plays in the SAFA Second Division Eastern Cape division.

Honours
National Soccer League
Winner:1985

External links
SAFA Official Website -database with results of Vodacom League

References

Association football clubs established in 2007
SAFA Second Division clubs
Soccer clubs in the Eastern Cape
2007 establishments in South Africa
Phoenix clubs (association football)